Carbactinoceratidae is a family of extinct cephalopods with external shells that lived around 325 million years ago, during the Carboniferous period. They were the last group of orthocones to attain sizes exceeding one meter (three feet) in length.

Characters 
Shells of carbactinoceratids are usually straight or slightly curved,  with a large central or subcentral siphuncle. The first chamber at the apex is long and conical, the first septum slightly convex with the a  septal perforation about one third of the shell diameter and a cyrtochoanitic septal neck (tubular or funnel-like projection from the back of the septum. The first siphuncle segment is elongated, subsequent ones formed during growth of the animal are subglobular (rounded but not spherical). Organic deposits are formed within the siphuncle through which run central, and radial canals along with a seam along the connecting rings known as a perispatium.

Genera
 Aploceras
 Carbactinoceras
 Rayonnoceras

Relationships to other cephalopods 

Schindewolf (1941) and Teichert (1964) classified the Carbactinoceratidae within the actinocerids based on siphuncle similarity.

In both groups the siphuncle contains collar-like deposits and radial canals.

However, there are some problems with the actinocerid hypothesis. Carbactinocerids such as Carbactinoceras appear much later than the last definite actinocerids, leaving a large stratigraphic gap between the two.
Furthermore, carbactinoceratids share key characters from the early development of  pseudorthocerids missing from actinocerids. Among these is a bullet-shaped apex that is not constricted, and a first segment of the siphuncle that is relatively narrow.
Moreover, pseudorthocerids abounded in the Carboniferous period and so eliminate the stratigraphic gap.

References

External links 
Shell-Shock: Three University Of Arkansas Students Find World's Longest Nautiloid Fossil - an article about the recently found Arkansas Rayonnoceras.

Orthoceratoidea
Prehistoric cephalopod families
Carboniferous cephalopods of North America
Mississippian animals of North America
Mississippian United States
Mississippian first appearances
Mississippian extinctions